Longley Park Sixth Form is a 16-18 academy and was previously a further education sixth form in the Longley area of Sheffield, South Yorkshire, England. It is not to be confused with the multi-campus Sheffield College. Longley Park Sixth Form was established in 2004 with circa 1,200 students enrolled. It is part of the Brigantia Learning Trust, an academies partnership with feeder school Hinde House 3-16 School.

History
It opened to the public and to students in September 2004 at a cost of £8.5 million. The sixth form has been visited by both the former Prime Minister Tony Blair and the former Home Secretary David Blunkett MP (who both opened it). It is just north of the Northern General Hospital on Barnsley Road (A6135), although the entrance is on Horninglow Road. It was designed by Ellis Williams of Preston Brook and built by Kier Northern.

In 2015 they had awards where David Blunkett was present.

Admissions
The Sixth Form provides a range of different courses for students between the age of 16-19 to choose at GCSE, BTEC, and A level (AS/A2).

Facilities
The sixth form has many different resources. These range from Interactive whiteboards in each class room,  to the Learning Resource Centre (LRC). The sixth form also has a Virtual Learning Environment (VLE) which is powered by the Open Source Course Management System (CMS), Moodle.

Lifelong Learning Network 
Longley Park Sixth Form is a partner institution of Higher Futures, the Lifelong Learning Network (LLN) for South Yorkshire, north Derbyshire and north Nottinghamshire.

References

External links
 Official website
 EduBase
 RIBA Award 2005
 Solar shading
 Use of aluminium in the building
 Joinery of the building

News items
 Sheffield Telegraph May 2008

Education in Sheffield
Educational institutions established in 2004
Sixth form colleges in South Yorkshire
2004 establishments in England